The Sukrimangela–Jabalpur Passenger is an Indian Railways passenger train running between Sukrimangela and Jabalpur on the newly converted Jabalpur–Nainpur line.

History 

The train covers the 51-kilometre journey in about 1 hour and 30 minutes. It is the only train currently running in the interior of the Satpura Ranges. Its average speed is 34 kilometres per hour. The JBP WDM-3A loco is in charge of the train. This train shares its rake with Mandovi Express.

Major stations

References

Slow and fast passenger trains in India
Rail transport in Madhya Pradesh
Transport in Jabalpur